Shafiu Mumuni (born 11 May 1995) is a Ghanaian professional footballer who last played as forward for Erbil SC.

Club career

Early career 
He started his career with Agona Swedru-based Division Two side, ABS FC, as an attacking midfielder but soon caught the attention of newly promoted Premier League side, Wassaman United, whose coach, Herbert Addo of blessed memory, converted Mumuni into a striker after discovering his potential during the 2012–2013 season.

Ashanti Gold 
After a successful Premiership debut, Ashanti Gold offered the young promising striker a 5-year contract at the start of the 2014-2015 league season with the view to develop him into a future asset for the club. That investment indeed paid off as Mumuni adjusted quickly into the Miners' set-up, leading to an excellent stint which saw him emerging as the club's top scorer season after season until he-2 parted ways with the club in July 2020. Before then, Mumuni won the league title, Edusei Cup and also led them to the CAF Confederation Cup and CAF Champions League on two occasions. On 27 October 2020, Shafiu left Ashanti Gold to sign a contract with US Monastir.

US Monastir
In October 2020, Shafiu signed a two-year deal with Tunisian Ligue Professionnelle 1 side US Monastir and featured regularly as the lead striker in the Tunisian League and the CAF Confederation Cup. However, a contractual breach by US Monastir led to an abrupt termination of the Shafiu's contract after just three months.

Erbil SC
Under the circumstance, terminating his contract with US Monsatir, in March 2021, Mumuni signed a four-month contract with Iraqi Super League side,  Erbil SC, from March 1, 2021, to June 30, 2021, to maintain his form.

International career

At the peak of Shafiu's career on the domestic scene in 2018, Mumuni was invited to the Black Stars B for a special Independence Anniversary match against Namibia in Windhoek which ended 1-1, with Shafiu fetching Ghana's equalizer. His crowning moment actually came when he captained Black Stars B to win silver at the  2019 WAFU Cup of Nations in Senegal. As an icing on the cake, Mumuni was awarded the Golden Boot after scoring four goals at the tournament, including a historic hat-trick against Ivory Coast in the semi-finals. That classic display compelled the then Black Stars coach, James Kwesi Appiah, to give Mumuni his maiden senior national team call-up against South Africa and São Tomé and Príncipe in the AFCON 2021 qualifiers in November 2019. After the COVID-19 pandemic.

Career statistics

Club

International

Honours
Ashanti Gold SC
 Ghanaian Premier League: 2014–2015
 Edusei Cup: 2019 

Ghana
 WAFU Cup of Nations runner-up: 2019

Individual
 WAFU Cup of Nations Golden Boot: 2019
WAFU Cup of Nations Best XI: 2019

References

1995 births
Living people
Ghanaian footballers
Ghana international footballers
Ashanti Gold SC players
US Monastir (football) players
Tunisian Ligue Professionnelle 1 players
Association football forwards
Ghanaian expatriate footballers
Expatriate footballers in Tunisia
Ghanaian expatriate sportspeople in Tunisia